Pierre de Carcavi was born in about 1603, in Lyon, France and died in Paris in April 1684. He was a secretary of the National Library of France under Louis XIV. Carcavi was a French mathematician.

Carcavi is known for his correspondence with Pierre de Fermat, Blaise Pascal, Christiaan Huygens, Galileo Galilei, Marin Mersenne, Evangelista Torricelli and René Descartes.

External links
 

French librarians
1600s births
1684 deaths
17th-century French mathematicians